Werner Zünd (born 23 January 1948) is a Swiss football manager.

References

1948 births
Living people
Swiss football managers
FC St. Gallen managers
FC Gossau managers